Simon Alexander McMenemy (born 6 December 1977) is a Scottish football manager. Previously he had spells as manager of Bhayangkara, Maldivian side New Radiant, Indonesia Super League club Pelita Bandung Raya, Mitra Kukar in Indonesia, Đồng Tâm Long An in Vietnam, Loyola Meralco Sparks in Philippines, the Philippines national team and the Indonesia national team.

He rejoined Bhayangkara in 2021, but as technical director

His first job in football was for Brighton & Hove Albion as a development officer. McMenemy then worked for Sportswear giants Nike. He was the assistant coach of English non-League football side Worthing before moving onto management. Previously, he'd applied for the Clyde vacancy in his native Scotland in 2014, but lost out to Barry Ferguson.

Coaching career

Haywards Heath Town
McMenemy started his career in coaching as manager of Sussex County League club Haywards Heath Town.

Philippines
Through Chris Greatwich, one of his former players at club Lewes, McMenemy heard about the vacant coaching job in the Philippines. Five weeks after applying, he received an offer from the Philippine Football Federation, the governing body of football in the country, to coach the Philippines national team.

After an undefeated group campaign, one win and two draws, the Philippines qualified second in the group to face the Indonesia national team in the semi-finals. The team was eventually defeated 2–0 on aggregate with Indonesia's Cristian Gonzáles scoring a goal in each leg of the semi-final. Both the home and away legs were held in Indonesia as the Philippines didn't have a stadium that met the international standard set by AFF.

The win of the Philippines over the Vietnam national football team during the group phase of the 2010 AFF Suzuki Cup was ranked as one of the "Top 10 soccer stories of 2010" by columnist Georgina Turner of American sports magazine Sports Illustrated.

McMenemy left the Philippines in January 2011, and was replaced by German manager Michael Weiß.

Loyola Meralco Sparks
On 26 August 2014, McMenemy was named head coach of the Loyola Meralco Sparks of the United Football League, replacing Vince Santos, who led the team to the 2013 Cup title but was unable to win the more prestigious UFL league titles in the past two years.

On 31 January 2015, McMenemy won his first silverware as a professional coach and as a Sparks manager. In December 2016, Loyola announced that McMenemy had left the club.

Bhayangkara
Indonesian club Bhayangkara appointed McMenemy to lead the club as its head coach on 23 December 2016. Bhayangkara won the Indonesian Liga 1 on that moment.

Indonesia
On 20 December 2018, McMenemy was appointed by Football Association of Indonesia as the head coach of national team, replacing Bima Sakti. PSSI decided to sack McMenemy on 6 November 2019 over the national team's deteriorating performance during  2022 World Cup qualification, shortly after Indonesia was awarded hosting rights for the 2021 FIFA U-20 World Cup.

Honours
Loyola Meralco Sparks
 United Football League Division 1: runners-up 2014
 PFF National Men's Club Championship: 2014–15

Bhayangkara
 Liga 1: 2017

Individual
 2017 Liga 1: Best Coach

References

External links
 
 Simon McMenemy Interview

1977 births
Living people
Footballers from Aberdeen
Scottish footballers
Worthing F.C. players
Haywards Heath Town F.C. players
Burgess Hill Town F.C. players
Kajaanin Haka players
Scottish football managers
Scottish expatriate football managers
Philippines national football team managers
Expatriate football managers in Indonesia
Expatriate football managers in Vietnam
Expatriate football managers in the Philippines
Expatriate football managers in the Maldives
Mitra Kukar managers
Pelita Bandung Raya managers
United Football League (Philippines) head coaches
Association footballers not categorized by position
Indonesia national football team managers
Scottish expatriate sportspeople in the Maldives
Scottish expatriate sportspeople in Vietnam
Scottish expatriate sportspeople in Indonesia
Scottish expatriate sportspeople in the Philippines